Egholm is a manor house and estate situated on the Hornsherred Peninsula, between Kirke Hyllinge and Skibby, in Lejre Municipality, some 60 km west of Copenhagen, Denmark. The Neoclassical main building from 1824, a gatehouse from 1870, a barn from 1880, a stable from circa 1890 and a former horse mill were listed on the Danish registry of protected buildings and places in 1998. Another building is now operated as an arms museum under the name Egholm Museum. The estate covers 770 hectares of land.

History

14th century – 1640: Early history
Egholm traces its history back to the 13th century. Remains of a Romanesque castle is still seen at the site. It is believed that it was built for Jacob Nielsen, Count of Halland, a grandson of Valdemar II. Egholm is first mention in written records in 1405 when it was owned by Predbjørn Podebusk. In 1419  he presented the estate to his nephew Henning Podebusk. In 1435, Henning Podebusk ceded it to his uncle's son Claus Podebusk. These transactions may, however, only have comprised a share of the estate since Hans Grubendal, who was probably married to Predbjørn Podebusk's daughter Gisele Podebusk, in 1436, is also mentioned as owner of Egholm. Gisele Podebusk was later married to Jens Due, who was the sole owner of Egholm from 1460.

Egholm was later ceded to the brothers Eiler and Niels Mogensen Hak, probably as an endowment by Gisele Podebusk and Jens Due. In 1484, Eiler Mogensen Hak acquired his brother's share of the estate. His widow  Anne Nielsdatter became the owner of the estate after his death in 1501. It was later passed on to first their son Christoffer Hak and then in 1539 their daughter Lene Krafse (née Hak). Egholm was after her death owned by members of the Krafse family for the next one hundred years.

1640–1804: Rosenkrantz and Skeel families
 
In 1640, Otto Krafse sold the estate to  Holger Rosenkrantz. Holger Rosenkrantz 'The Wealthy', was one of the most wealthy noblemen in the country. On his death in 1647, Egholm was passed on to his son Oluf Rosenkrantz. He expanded the estate through the acquisition of many new tenant farms. He later established a new manor from part of the estate, naming it Krabbesholm after his wife's family. He was created Friherre in  1671. Egholm was granted the status of a birk that same year with the effect that it became an independent jurisdiction. Rosenkrantz fell out of favour at the court after opposing the new Absolute monarchy and was forced to cede all his estates to his daughters and sons-in-law. Egholm was ceded to Mogens Skeel but Oluf Rosenkrantz and his wife Birgitte Krabbe lived on the estate until their deaths in 1685. Mogens Skeel then sold the estate to his brother Otte Skeel. He increased the estate through the acquisition of more land. After Skeel's death, Egholm was passed on to his daughter Birgitte Skeel and son-in-law Otto Krabbe. They had no children and Egholm was therefore endowed to Iver Rosenkrantz. He was already the owner of a number of other estates.

Iver Rosenkrantz died in 1745 and his widow Charlotte Amalie Skeel then owned the estate until her death in 1763. Their son Christian Rosenkrantz once again expanded the estate. He was also the owner of Krabbesholm, Ryegaard, Barritskov and Trudsholm. He endowed his estates to Niels Rosenkrantz with an obligation to establish a stamhus (family trust) from the estates. Stamhuset Rosenkrantz blev was established from  Ryegaard, Barritskov and Trudsholm while Egholm and Krabbesholm were sold to his brother Marcus Gøye Rosenkrantz. He sold Egholm to count  Christian Conrad Sophus Danneskiold-Samsøe and Lars Lassen just two months later. Lars Larsen became the sole owner of the estate in 1806 but sold it in 1809.

1812–1920: Haffner family
 
Johan Wolfgang Haffner acquired Egholm in 1812. By testament, he decided that the estate should be turned into a stamhus for the Haffner family in 1831. This was done by his son Wolfgang Haffner in 1831.

 
He also constructed a new main building, expanded the forests and sold the tenant farms to the tenant farmers.

After his death in 1887, Stamhuset Egholm was passed on to his eldest daughter Amalie Haffner. On her death in 1902, it was passed on to her younger sister, Ebba Wilhelmine Haffner, who was married to a Swedish count. The next owner was her son, Erik Alfred Wolfgang Haffner Piper, a Swedish count.

1920–present: Later history
The stamhus was dissolved as a result of the Lensafløsningsloven of 1919. The main building and park were then disjoined from the home farm (avlsgården) which was sold to the manager. The main building was sold to Axel Kaufmann. He later sold it to baroness Henny Caroline Wedell-Neergaard.

Ole Falck, a great-great-grandson of Sophus Falck, founder of Falck, purchased the main building in 1988. He later also purchased its former home farm, Egholm Møllegård and Egholm Skovgård as well as most of the land that had previously belonged to the estate.

Architecture
 
The main building is designed in the Neoclassical style and is surrounded by moats. It is a simple, two-storey white-rendered building with a rounded avant-corps towards the garden. Windows and doors have sandstone framing. The building is topped by a hip roof with black-glazed tiles.

 
The main building from 1824, gatehouse from 1870, a barn from 1880, a stable from circa 1890 and a former horse mill were listed on the Danish registry of protected buildings and places in 1998.

Surroundings
The estate has a total area of 570 hectares and comprises Egholm Skov. Egholm Skovgård and Egholm Møllegård are located close by. The forest contains two burial mounds from the Bronze Age. Some of the buildings are operated as an equestrian centre.

Egholm Arms Museum
Egholm Museum was inaugurated in 2012 and features Ole Falck's extensive collection of firearms and accoutrements.

The museum starts with a display of exhibits about Danish and German soldiers and material from the occupation of Denmark during World War II. It is followed by exhibitions about the British, Russian and American troops. The section on World War II ends with an exhibition about the Danish resistance movement.

The next section of the museum is dedicated to the Wild West. Exhibits include a stagecoach, a stuffed bison, antique weapons and artifacts from that time. There is also a large collection of hunting weapons and equipment with a poacher's home and various weapons used for poaching.

The museum is also home to a collection of historic arms dating back to the 17th century. The collection also comprises a number of curiosities, such as the flag from Adolf Hitler's bunker in Berlin, Saddam Hussein's revolver and gas masks for horses.

List of owners
 (1405–1419)          Predbjørn Podebusk 
 (1419–1435)          Henning Podebusk 
 (1435–      )          Claus Podebusk  
 (1436–      )          Hans Grubendal 
 (1460–      )          Jens Due 
 (      –1484)          Niels Mogensen Hak 
 (      –1501)          Ejler Mogensen Hak 
 (1501–1534)          Anne Nielsdatter Hak 
 (1534v1539)          Christoffer Hak 
 (1539–1564)          Lene Krafse née Hak 
 (1564–1599)          Eiler Krafse 
 (1599–1602)          Hilleborg Bille 
 (1602–1620)          Christoffer Krafse 
 (1620–      )          Dorte Andersdatter Krafse née Banner
 (      –1633)          Otto Krafse 
 (1633)                 Henrik Holck 
 (1633–1639)          Hilleborg Holck née Krafse
 (1639–1640)          Otto Krafse 
 (1640–1647)          Holger Rosenkrantz  
 (1647–1684)          Oluf Rosenkrantz 
 (1684–1685)          Mogens Skeeliver  
 (1685–1695)          Otte Skeel  
 (1695–1719)          Otto Krabbe  
 (1719–1737)          Birgitte Krabbe née Skeel
 (1737–1745)          Iver Rosenkrantz  
 (1745–1763)          Charlotte Amalie Rosenkrantz née Skeel 
 (1763–1802)          Frederik Christian Rosenkrantz  
 (1802–1804)          Niels Rosenkrantz  
 (1804)                 Marcus Gøye Rosenkrantz  
 (1804–1806)          Christian Conrad Sophus Danneskiold-Samsøe 
 (1804–1809)          Lars Lassen
 (1809–1812)          Harald Rothe
 (1809–1812)          Christian Rothe 
 (1812–1829)          Johan Wolfgang Reinhold Haffner 
 (1829–1887)          Wolfgang Haffner  
 (1887–1902)          Amalie Langenau née von Haffner
 (1902–1914)          Ebba Haffner Piper  
 (1914–1920)          Erik Carl Alfred Haffner Piper  
 (1920–1938)          Axel Otto Tage Niels Basse Kauffmann 
 (1938–1954)          Henny Caroline Wedell-Neergaard née Moltke
 (1954–      )          Alex Christiani
 (1988–      )          Dorrik Aps, v. Ole Falck

See also
 Krabbesholm

References

External links
 Official website
 Egholm Ridecenter
 Source
 Source

Listed buildings and structures in Lejre Municipality
Listed castles and manor houses in Denmark
Manor houses in Lejre Municipality
Neoclassical architecture in Denmark
Houses completed in 1841
Military and war museums in Denmark
World War II museums
American West museums
Museums in Region Zealand
Museums established in 2012
Buildings and structures in Denmark associated with the Rosenkrantz family
Buildings and structures associated with the Skeel family